La Peral (variant: San Jorge) is one of three parishes (administrative divisions) in Illas, a municipality of Asturias, by northern Iberic Picos de Europa mountains.

Demography

Villages
 L'Argañosa
 La Peral
 Reconcu
 Rozaflor

Parishes in Illas